Jose Benjamin "Benjo" Abrio Benaldo (born 1970) was a member of the Congress of the Philippines from 2010 until 2013.

He is the son of former DILG Assistant Secretary, Serafin Benaldo. Benaldo studied AB Economics in La Salle, and Law in Ateneo. Before becoming a congressman, Benaldo was a councilor in Cagayan de Oro.

References

People from Cagayan de Oro
1967 births
Members of the House of Representatives of the Philippines from Cagayan de Oro
Filipino city and municipal councilors
Living people